Susan Claire Van den Heever is a South African atmospheric scientist who is a professor at Colorado State University. Her research considers cloud physics and mesoscale modelling. She is a fellow of the American Meteorological Society and the editor of the Journal of the Atmospheric Sciences.

Early life and education 
Van den Heever is from South Africa. She earned her bachelor's degree at the University of the Witwatersrand, where she studied mathematics and physical geography. She remained at the University for a further year, where she completed an honorary diploma in education. She then worked as a mathematics teacher at a high school in Johannesburg. She eventually returned to university, where she worked toward a graduate degree in geography. Her master's research involved modelling on tropical-temperate troughs in South Africa. Specifically, she studied El Niño–Southern Oscillation and south African drought. Van den Heever eventually moved to the United States as a doctoral researcher. She completed her PhD at Colorado State University, where she investigated supercell storms. After earning her doctorate, van den Heever worked as a postdoctoral scholar and then research scientist at Colorado State University.

Research and career 
In 2008, van den Heever joined the faculty at Colorado State University. She developed the cloud-resolving numerical model Regional Atmospheric Modeling System. She was named the Monfort Professor in 2015. In 2020 she moved the University of Oxford as a Visiting Professor in the Department of Physics.

Van den Heever's research considers storm systems and the impacts of air pollution on cloud formation. She was part of the NASA Cloud, Aerosol and Monsoon Processes Philippines Experiment (CAMP2Ex), which flew over the oceans close to the Philippines and collected data on the aerosols and cloud microphysics. She partnered with the Jet Propulsion Laboratory to deploy a radar system on board the International Space Station.

Awards and honours 
 2002 NASA Group Achievement Award to CRYSTAL-FACE Science Team
 2013 Colorado State University Outstanding Professor of the Year Award
 2015 Colorado State University Outstanding Professor of the Year Award
 2016 American Geophysical Union ASCENT Award
 2018 Edward N. Lorenz Teaching Excellence Award
 2021 Massachusetts Institute of Technology Houghton Lectureship
 2021 Fellow of the American Meteorological Society

Selected publications

References 

Living people
Atmospheric scientists
South African scientists
Colorado State University faculty
Colorado State University alumni
University of the Witwatersrand alumni
Year of birth missing (living people)